Wyon Dale "W. D." Childers (born November 25, 1933) is a former West Florida politician who served 30 years in the State Senate, from 1970 to 2000, including a stint as Senate President from 1980 to 1982 and as dean from 1988 to 2000. He holds the title of Florida's longest-serving state legislator. He earned the nickname "Banty Rooster" – after the diminutive, swaggering barnyard fowl – and became known for his eccentric mannerisms and colorful, folksy expressions. Childers was popular in his district for the ample state funding and "turkey" projects he sent home, including $12.5 million for the Pensacola Civic Center and the I-110 extension to Gregory Street. Initially a Democrat, he switched to the Republican Party in 1995.

After term limits forced him from the Florida Senate in 2000, Childers ran for the District 1 seat of the Escambia County Commission. He became embroiled in the soccer complex corruption scandal and was found guilty of violating the Florida Sunshine Law and of bribing Commissioner Willie Junior to help push the purchases of two properties, totaling $6.2 million, from Childers' associates Joe and Georgann Elliott.

Childers served nearly three years of a 42-month prison sentence in West Palm Beach and was released on 17 June 2009, after which he relocated away from Pensacola. On 8 June 2010, a federal appeals court overturned the bribery conviction, ruling that Childers' constitutional right to confront his accuser had been violated, as the defense team was not allowed to question Junior on his change of testimony. on June 02. 2011 the 11 Circuit Court of Appeals in Atlanta reinstated the Bribery Conviction thereby denying the former State Senator from Participating in the State Retirement System.

Early life and education
Born in Wright, Florida (then known as Crackers Neck), Wyon Dale Childers attended the Bay County High School and went on to Florida State University, where he met Ruth Adell Johnson. They were married on 21 December 1953. Childers graduated with a Bachelor of Science degree in education in 1955. He became a math teacher and supplemented his salary with roofing work and door-to-door sales. He capitalized on the sale of trendy items – hula hoops in the 50s, color televisions in the 60s – and also practiced real estate.

Florida Senate career

In 1970 Childers ran for the Florida Senate seat vacated by Reubin Askew, who went on to become a long-serving governor of Florida.

Childers was for many years chair of the General Government Appropriations Committee, which established budgets for most of the state agencies. He was considered a master of so-called "turkey" projects that were tacked onto other bills and sent state funding back to his home district. Some of the local projects that benefited from his influence included:

Pensacola Civic Center
I-110 extension from Maxwell/Jordan Streets south to Gregory Street
Four-laning of US 29 north to Alabama border
Big Lagoon State Park
Blue Angel Parkway
M. C. Blanchard Judicial Building
Sewer system at Century
Computer center at UWF
Science building at PJC
Athletics at UWF & PJC
T. T. Wentworth Museum
Pensacola Historic District
Naval Aviation Museum
Saenger Theatre restoration
Establishment of ECUA and PEDC
Santa Rosa Island Bike Trail
Ellyson Field
Perdido Key Fire Station
Bayou Chico and Bayou Texar restoration projects

He was repeatedly honored by other legislators with Allen Morris Awards: for Most Effective in Debate 1975, '76 and '80; Most Effective in Committee 1978; and Most Effective Member of the Senate, 1979.

In 1980 Childers pushed the state legislature to buy land for the Big Lagoon State Park from a Pensacola auto dealer. He was called before a grand jury when it was revealed that he owned another piece of property with Fiveash, and he claimed he had not made the "mental connection" between the two properties. The grand jury cleared him of wrongdoing and praised him as "an example to other public servants who, having sought the public trust, are asked to show that they deserve it."

On 1 June 1981, an argument between Childers and Senator Dempsey Barron over a bill nearly resulted in a fight on the Senate floor. Barron later organized a group of legislators that effectively stripped Childers of his power as Senate President.

In 1993 Childers worked with attorney Fred Levin to draft legislation that would amend the Florida Medicaid Third Party Recovery Act, enabling the State of Florida to sue the tobacco industry for the costs of treating illnesses caused by cigarette smoking. The bill was pushed through quickly and signed into law by Governor Lawton Chiles before it could attract the attention of the tobacco industry's lobbyists. The legislation ultimately led to a class action lawsuit that yielded a $13.2 billion settlement for the State of Florida.

Term limits
Due to the "Eight is Enough" constitutional amendment passed by Florida voters in 1992, which limited legislators' terms of office to eight consecutive years, Childers' name was not allowed on the ballot in 2000. He considered running for his Senate seat regardless as a write-in candidate, exploiting a loophole in the amendment's wording – and even received a concession from election officials that would allow voters to write just the letters "W. D." – but later decided to serve as Escambia County Commissioner for one term, until he could constitutionally reclaim his Senate seat.

Escambia County Commission
Childers ran for the Escambia County District 1 seat formerly held by Mike Whitehead, who was preparing a campaign to challenge Escambia County Clerk of Court Ernie Lee Magaha. Childers' opponents in the race were Democrat Williemae Stanberry and Reform Party candidate Teddy Laviano. Despite a commanding lead over both opponents, Childers ran a series of negative ads in the final weeks of the campaign.

After the election, Childers appointed Stanberry to an interim post on the Board of Adjustment. She said there were no grudges between them: "We never had a bad relationship – that's just the way W. D. does politics."

On 7 June 2001, Childers replaced Tom Banjanin, who was considering a run against U.S. Representative Joe Scarborough, as commission chairman. He organized a voting bloc with commissioners Willie Junior and Mike Bass that was able to pass any motion over the opposition of Banjanin and Terry Smith. After six county leaders resigned between October '01 and February '02 – county administrator Tom Forrest, assistant administrator Bill Neron, acting administrator Gregg Welstead, county engineer Cindy Anderson, parks and recreation director Mark Thornton, and county attorney David Tucker – many blamed the exodus on Childers' brusque leadership style. It was during this same time frame that Childers, Junior and Bass pushed through two contentious land purchases that would lead to indictments and scandal.

Corruption scandal
On 4 October 2001, Commissioner Willie Junior proposed, as an add-on to the commission agenda, to negotiate a purchase price for the Pensacola Soccer Complex. The motion was approved unanimously. On 1 November, the commission voted 3–2 to use $3.9 million in local option sales tax funds to buy the property, and they formally closed on 20 November. On 10 January 2002, Junior made another add-on motion to purchase the former Stalnaker Mazda property for $2.3 million, which was approved 3–2. In both votes, Childers and Bass affirmed Junior's motion while Banjanin and Smith opposed.

State Attorney Curtis Golden announced on 7 February an investigation into the commission over possible corruption related to the land purchases. In testimony before a grand jury, Childers revealed that he had written around $90,000 in checks to Commissioner Junior, but insisted they were "loans".

On 30 April, four commissioners were booked into Escambia County Jail on 27 charges, which included bribery, racketeering, and violating the state's Sunshine Law. Governor Jeb Bush suspended the four indicted commissioners on 1 May 1 and appointed temporary replacements on 10 May. Former Pensacola News Journal publisher Cliff Barnhart was tapped to fill the District 1 seat.

Childers was charged with additional counts of money laundering and bribery on 16 June, but was released from jail on $50,000 bond.

On 28 June, he was convicted on one count of violating Sunshine Law over a call he and Commissioner Smith made to Supervisor of Elections Bonnie Jones over country redistricting. Meanwhile, Commissioner Junior pleaded no contest to 10 felony charges and one misdemeanor charge relating to misdeeds that had been committed during his tenure as commissioner.

The Pensacola Soccer Complex had been purchased by Joe and Georgann Elliott for $3.3 million. The county purchased the property for $3.9 million, netting the Elliotts a profit of around $561,000. According to the state's allegations, they paid a bribe of $200,000 to Childers, who in turn paid around $100,000 to Junior. Junior testified that Childers had given him a stainless steel "collard-green pot" full of cash a few days after the county closed on the property, which he transferred to a paper bag at his home. He also claimed to have received $10,000 from Joe Elliott directly, the day before the vote to buy the property. Wanting to deposit some of the money in a bank, but fearful of the government reporting requirements of depositing cash, he returned $40,000 to Childers in exchange for a cashier's check for the same amount. Junior later received several other checks from Childers totaling $90,000.

On April 10, Childers was found guilty of two charges of bribery and unlawful compensation.
Willie Junior was found dead under a downtown home's front porch after a neighbor noticed a strange smell. His cause of death never really came to light. In two separate jury trials, Joe and Georgann Elliot were acquitted of all charges in December 2002 and April 2004, respectively.

References

External links

|-

|-

|-

Living people
Presidents of the Florida Senate
Florida state senators
People from Escambia County, Florida
1933 births
Florida State University alumni
Florida Democrats
Florida Republicans
People from Okaloosa County, Florida